The Akhrakouaeronon or Atrakouaehronon were a subtribe of the Susquehannock. They lived in present-day Northumberland County, Pennsylvania. Their principal town was Atrakwaye. On John Smith's map of Susquehannock territory, it is referred to as Quadroque.

Notes

Native American tribes in Pennsylvania
Indigenous peoples of the Northeastern Woodlands
Susquehannock